Custer Township, Nebraska may refer to the following places in Nebraska:

 Custer Township, Antelope County, Nebraska
 Custer Township, Custer County, Nebraska

See also
 East Custer Township, Custer County, Nebraska
Custer Township (disambiguation)

Nebraska township disambiguation pages